State Route 535 (SR 535) is the Nevada Department of Transportation (NDOT) designation for two discontinuous sections of Idaho Street just west of and within the small city of Elko in the northeastern part of the U.S. state of Nevada. Both segments are also signed as Interstate 80 Business, which is also signed along the city-maintained segment of Idaho Street between the two NDOT segments as well as the city-maintained segment of Idaho Street east of the final eastern terminus all the way to East Jennings Way, from which it connects to the Elko East exit on Interstate 80. Most of Interstate 80 Business in Elko, including both segments of SR 535, were formerly designated U.S. Route 40.

Route description

Interstate 80 Business/SR 535 begins at the Elko West interchange (Exit 298) of Interstate 80 (I-80) southwest of the Elko city limits. The two routes travel to the east on Idaho Street and pass just south of Elko Regional Airport.  The western segment of SR 535 ends after  at the city limits of Elko, while the Interstate 80 Business designation continues east along Idaho Street. After a further , the roadway reaches the southeastern corner of the airport, where there is an intersection with the southern terminus of SR 225 (Mountain City Highway). At this point, the eastern segment of SR 535 begins and continues east along Idaho Street with Interstate 80 Business a further  into downtown Elko. In downtown Elko, the roadway has an intersection with the northern terminus of SR 227, where the eastern segment of SR 535 ends. However, Interstate 80 Business continues another , at first continuing east along Idaho Street to East Jennings Way. At East Jennings Way, Interstate 80 Business turns to the northwest and quickly ends at I-80's Elko East interchange (Exit 303). The final section of the route along East Jennings Way is NDOT-maintained under designation FREL17 (Elko County Frontage Road 17).

SR 535 is not part of the National Highway System, a system of roadways important to the nation's economy, defense, and mobility.

History

Except for the small portion of the route at the east end named East Jennings Way, the entirety of Interstate 80 Business in Elko was originally Nevada State Route 1 and later U.S. Route 40.  Interstate 80 was constructed as a bypass of downtown Elko around 1980, by which time U.S. 40 had been removed in favor of the interstate.

Major intersections

See also

References

535
Transportation in Elko County, Nevada
Elko, Nevada